Life and Philosophy of Swami Vivekananda (1989) is an English book written by G. S Banhatti. This is a biography of Swami Vivekananda. The books were published by Atlantic Publishers & Dist, New Delhi.

Content 
Life and Philosophy of Swami Vivekananda is a biography of Swami Vivekananda. The book is divided into several chapters. Each chapter deals with a part of the life of Vivekananda. For example, the first chapter deals with Vivekananda's birth, childhood and early school life and the second chapter is named "Spiritual apprenticeship", it starts in 1881 when Vivekananda had a nervous breakdown and went to Gaya for a change and so on. The last two chapters of the book discusses on poems and prose written by Vivekananda.

References

External links 
 

1989 non-fiction books
Swami Vivekananda
Contemporary philosophical literature
Vedanta
Indian biographies
Books about Swami Vivekananda
20th-century Indian books